Roman Pavelka (4 January 1968 – 14 February 2001) was a Czech football midfielder. He had joined lower-league SK Uničov when collapsing during training and dying from a heart condition.

References

1968 births
2001 deaths
Czech footballers
FC Baník Ostrava players
FK Drnovice players
AFK Atlantic Lázně Bohdaneč players
Czechoslovak First League players
Czech First League players
Association football midfielders